The Bill Bailey Skiffle Group made seven appearances on BBC Radio's Saturday Skiffle Club (only Johnny Duncan and Chas McDevitt had more slots on the show) yet no record company ever signed them up.

They lay claim to have been the first British skiffle group because in 1945, Bill Bailey, Freddy Legon and Johnny Jones formed the Original London Blue Blowers. They were featured in jazz broadcasts and as guests in the rhythm clubs that flourished on the fringes of the music scene, mainly playing spasm music and jug music. The combo broke up in 1948 when the two guitar players began playing in various Dixieland bands.

While Freddy Legon was playing guitar and banjo with the Humphrey Lyttelton Band in 1951, he advised a 16-year-old Charles McDevitt on the type of banjo he should take up.

Lineup
 Bill Bailey - Guitar, Kazoo, and Vocals
 Dave Coward - Bass
 Stan Jayne - Guitar, Washboard, Vocals
 Bill Powell - Guitar, Banjo
 Freddy Legon - Guitar, Comb and paper, Vocals
 John Beauchamp - Drums

References

British pop music groups
British folk music groups
Skiffle groups